Jurassic World: The Ride is a dark ride / water ride attraction that is themed to the Jurassic World series at Universal Studios Hollywood. The original Jurassic Park: The Ride, which operated from June 21, 1996, to September 3, 2018, underwent a major refurbishment and reopened as Jurassic World: The Ride.

History
The ride was announced on May 10, 2018, by Universal Studios Hollywood officials during a 25th anniversary celebration of the 1993 film Jurassic Park, directed by Steven Spielberg. It was stated that Jurassic Park: The Ride, which opened on June 21, 1996, would be closed for retheming based on the 2015 film Jurassic World and its 2018 sequel Jurassic World: Fallen Kingdom. The Jurassic Cafe restaurant and Jurassic Outfitters retail store near the original attraction were also closed temporarily to be rethemed.

Universal Creative worked on the new ride, and Jon Corfino was the project director and show producer. He worked closely on the ride with Colin Trevorrow and Frank Marshall, the director and producer respectively for the 2015 film. Corfino worked to blend elements of the old ride with the new one, and the final idea was presented to Spielberg. The team had to rush to get the ride finished for the busy summer tourist season. Mosasaurus, an aquatic reptile that appeared in the films, is digitally featured on the ride. Industrial Light & Magic collaborated with the design team at Universal Studios Hollywood to create the creature and its environment. The walls of the Mosasaurus tank are depicted across four large, high-definition screens on both sides of the boat. A 3D effect makes objects in the foreground move faster than those in the background, a technique that gives the Mosasaurus a realistic appearance. The attraction also features larger dinosaurs than Jurassic Park: The Ride, and new animatronics allow the dinosaurs to move better than their predecessors. Chris Pratt, Bryce Dallas Howard, and B.D. Wong reprise their roles from Jurassic World and Jurassic World: Fallen Kingdom.

The attraction officially opened on July 12, 2019, without advanced notice or fanfare. It previously had a soft opening for friends and family of Universal employees. The official opening coincided with a number of other Jurassic World-themed attractions adjacent to the ride entrance. Guests can take part in the Triceratops Encounter, where guests interact with Juliet, a Triceratops, and Dino Play, in which young visitors excavate large dinosaur fossils. Guests can also interact with baby dinosaurs along with their trainer. The Mosasaurus is part of the Aquarium Observatory section, an area that responds to real-world weather, changing between day time and night time depending on the actual time of day. Jurassic Cafe introduced a bar called Isla Nu-bar, named after the series' fictional Isla Nublar island.

Following a refurbishment in 2021, the ride's climax was updated with a new Indominus Rex animatronic.

Ride description

Queue
Guests enter through the Jurassic World gates and into a series of switchbacks. The queue is designed to look like Isla Nublar from the film. The queue is covered with posters and billboards explaining the dinosaurs at the park. Overhead, video monitors display "Jurassic World Network", the island's TV station which shows Dino facts as well as interviews with characters from the movie. As guests approach the loading area, smaller monitors display safety info before guests board their boat.

Ride
Each boat is capable of holding 25 people. The ride begins by climbing an initial lift hill, and the boats are taken to the Mosasaurus Aquarium Observatory, encountering a Mosasaurus. Guests then go to a lush, tropical area, where they find a mother Stegosaurus and her baby and encounter a Parasaurolophus before entering Predator Cove, where the riders see carnage has ensued after the Indominus rex has broken out of its paddock, along with the Tyrannosaurus rex and some Dilophosaurus. Riders overhear that the ACU is being called in to round up the escaped dinosaurs, passing by a damaged Gyrosphere and a pair of Compsognathus fighting over a tourist's hat. Claire Dearing comes in over a monitor and tries to comfort the riders, but her feed breaks up before riders traverse another lift hill, where they see the "Indominus" itself spying on them through a hole in the nearby wall. Owen Grady then patches in and says to not move out of the boat. He then sends Blue to help the riders escape.

As the boat nears the top of the lift, a Velociraptor holding a chewed wire lunges at guests through a hole in the ceiling. Following attempts by Dilophosaurus to spit venom (actually water) at riders and a close call with the Indominus, the riders meet up with Blue the Velociraptor, who guides them to an exit, but the Indominus has made it there first. The Tyrannosaurus then appears and attacks the Indominus, which buys riders the time needed to escape. The riders exit the ride into the gift shop.

Reception
Reaction from riders was mostly positive at the time of opening. Todd Martens of the Los Angeles Times called it "an imperfect ride but the perfect one for where the 'Jurassic Park' franchise has gone," stating that the Jurassic World films focused more on thrills than story. Martens stated that the ride "packs plenty of tension and scares and wow-inducing special effects into its five-plus minutes. But it does this at the expense of a sense of awe, grandeur and basic grasp of storytelling that the original attraction possessed." Laure Prudom of IGN wrote "once you move past the nostalgia, most of the updates help enhance the exhilaration of the ride, and aside from the mosasaurus's screens, the rest of the ride focuses on practical effects and tangible animatronics, which helps it retain its charm."

See also
 VelociCoaster

References

Animatronic attractions
Amusement rides introduced in 2019
Universal Studios Hollywood
Jurassic Park in amusement parks